Whidden is a surname. Notable people with the surname include:

Bob Whidden (born 1946), former professional ice hockey player
Charles B. Whidden (1835–1902), farmer, merchant, ship owner and political figure in Nova Scotia, Canada
Evan M. Whidden (1898–1980), Canadian Christian minister, President of Brandon College, Dean of Theology at Acadia University
Howard P. Whidden (1871–1952), Canadian churchman, member of Parliament, educator, scholar and editor of Canadian Baptist
James Whidden Allison (1795–1867), farmer and political figure in Nova Scotia
R. Whidden Ganong, CM (1906–2000), Canadian businessman from the Province of New Brunswick
Richard Whidden, 1989 Mystery Lake School Division Trustee, Manitoba, Canada
Tom Whidden, sailor and sailmaker
William M. Whidden (1857–1929), founding member of Whidden & Lewis, an architectural firm in Portland, Oregon, United States

See also
Whidden Creek, a stream in Florida
Whidden & Lewis, architectural firm in Portland, Oregon, United States
Whidden Lectures, at McMaster University
Whidden Memorial Hospital, 162-bed medical/surgical and psychiatric hospital in Everett, Massachusetts
Whidden–Kerr House and Garden, Portland, Oregon, listed on the National Register of Historic Places
Weiden (disambiguation)
WiDEN
Widen
Wieden (disambiguation)
Wyden (disambiguation)
Whidden Hill, west Middlesex County, England

English-language surnames